Unsere Farm in Irland is a German television series set in an Irish rural location, concerning the move to Ireland of a doctor from a German city.

See also
List of German television series

External links
 

2007 German television series debuts
2010 German television series endings
Television shows set in the Republic of Ireland
German-language television shows
ZDF original programming